Jeffrey Gail Tarango (born November 20, 1968) is a retired American tennis player. He was a top-ten doubles player and a runner-up at the 1999 French Open men's doubles tournament. He is now the Director of Tennis at the Jack Kramer Club, which is just south of Los Angeles. In 2018, he was the tournament director of a $30,000 men's California championships. At that championships, ATP world-ranked No. 11, Sam Querrey, beat Davis Cup captain Mardy Fish to win this event.

Tarango now resides in Manhattan Beach, California with his wife and children. He is married to Jessica Balgrosky and they have five children (Nina Rose, Katherine, Jackson, Ace, and Jesse).

Career

Pro tour
Tarango turned professional in 1989, after completing his junior year at Stanford University, where he won two NCAA team titles. During his career, he won two top-level singles titles and 14 doubles titles. Tarango reached two Super 9 quarterfinals, Rome in 1995 and Miami in 1998. His career-high world rankings are No. 42 in singles and No. 10 in doubles. He was runner-up in the men's doubles at the 1999 French Open, partnering with Goran Ivanišević.

Wimbledon 1995 default
In the third round trailing 6–7, 1–3 to Alexander Mronz, Tarango became infuriated with French umpire Bruno Rebeuh, who had ruled against Tarango several times. During the match, when preparing to serve, the crowd heckled Tarango and he responded "Oh, shut up!" Rebeuh immediately issued a code violation to Tarango on the grounds of audible obscenity. Tarango protested this and called for the tournament referee calling for Rebeuh to be removed. No relief was given to Tarango and he was instructed to continue to play. He then accused Rebeuh of being "one of the most corrupt officials in the game" – to this Rebeuh gave Tarango another code violation, this time for unsportsmanlike conduct. Tarango took umbrage, packed up his rackets and stormed off the court. To add to the controversy, Tarango's wife at the time then slapped Rebeuh twice in the face.

Tarango was eventually banned by the ITF from the 1996 Wimbledon tournament.

Tarango was also the beneficiary of a default in the men's doubles tournament earlier at the same championship. He and partner Henrik Holm were at two sets to one down against the team of Jeremy Bates and Tim Henman when Henman angrily smashed a ball which inadvertently hit ball girl Caroline Hall, resulting in their disqualification. Coincidentally, Hall was also a ball girl in Tarango's match against Mronz.

After retirement
Tarango retired from the main tour in 2003 and now devotes his time to coaching, broadcasting for BBC, ESPN, Tennis Channel, Fox Sports and DirecTV. He also hosts a charity event in La Jolla for the Rady Children's Hospital in San Diego. Tarango is currently the vice chair for the AAC on the USOC (Governance Committee). He has been a member of the Davis Cup Committee for six years within the USTA. He still makes occasional appearances at professional events, including the 2008 USA F21 Futures event in Milwaukee. He also commentates for BBC Radio and in particular for their extended coverage on BBC Radio 5 Live Sports Extra. During his broadcasting career, Tarango has earned a reputation for having a good eye for potential Hawk-Eye overrules.

In his 2009 autobiography, Open, Andre Agassi claims that Tarango cheated in a juniors tournament to hand the eight-year-old Agassi his first-ever competitive loss. To which, Tarango says they had a chair umpire and Agassi is lying throughout the book "just to make money".
Tarango has coached many players such as Younes El Aynaoui, Andrei Medvedev, Maria Sharapova, Vince Spadea, Mirjana Lucic, Irakli Labadze, JC Aragone.

After professional tennis, Tarango worked for the AON Corporation with Theodore Forstmann, Andy Roddick, and many other society notables.

ATP career finals

Singles: 6 (2 titles, 4 runner-ups)

Doubles: 25 (14 titles, 11 runners-up)

ATP Challenger and ITF Futures finals

Singles: 6 (3–3)

Doubles: 7 (4–3)

Performance timelines

Singles

Doubles

Mixed doubles

Junior Grand Slam finals

Doubles: 1 (1 runner-up)

References

External links
 
 

1968 births
Living people
American people of Italian descent
American male tennis players
American tennis coaches
Olympic tennis players of the United States
Sportspeople from Manhattan Beach, California
Stanford Cardinal men's tennis players
Tennis people from California
Tennis players at the 2000 Summer Olympics